Chesapeake Shores is a Canadian/American drama television series, based on the novel series of the same name by Sherryl Woods. The series had a two-hour premiere on the Hallmark Channel on August 14, 2016. The ensemble cast includes Meghan Ory, Jesse Metcalfe, Treat Williams, Laci J. Mailey, Emilie Ullerup, Brendan Penny, Andrew Francis, Barbara Niven and Diane Ladd.

A spinoff television film is also in production.

Series overview

Episodes

Season 1 (2016)

Season 2 (2017)

Season 3 (2018)

Season 4 (2019)

Season 5 (2021)

Season 6 (2022)

Ratings

References

External links

Chesapeake Shores